A Taste of Fear (aliases: Something of Fear or A Bit of Fear or Something from Fear or A Touch of Fear, Egyptian Arabic: شئ من الخوف, translit: Shey Min El Khouf or Shey min al-Khouf) is a 1969 Egyptian film directed by Hussein Kamal and produced by Salah Zulfikar. The film is based on a short story by the great writer Tharwat Abaza, but the greatest credit for the political projections is the result of the modifications made by Abdel Rahman El-Abnudi to the script. The film was filmed in black and white, despite the possibility of filming in color, due to the spread of color films at this time, due to the director Hussein Kamal's exploitation of black and white shades in a skill that would not have been possible if it had been filmed in color. The film was nominated for the Moscow International Film Festival best film award. A Taste of Fear is listed in the CIFF Top 100 Egyptian films of the 20th century.

Plot 
The story takes place in an Egyptian village where Atris (Mahmoud Morsi) imposes his authority on the people of the village and imposes royalties on them.  Atris had been in love with Fouadah (Shadia) since his childhood, but Fouada challenges Atris by opening the lock, which he closed as punishment for the villagers, and because Atris loves Fouadah, he cannot kill her, so he decides to marry her.

Hafez (Muhammad Tawfik) Fouada's father cannot disobey the order of Atris, so he marries her to him with false witness testimony.

Because of this false marriage, Sheikh Ibrahim (Yehia Chahine) confronts Atris and kills Atris Mahmoud, the son of Sheikh Ibrahim.

The scene of the end comes with the scene of Mahmoud's funeral, in which Sheikh Ibrahim repeats his famous sentence, “Atris’s marriage from Fouada is invalid.” All the people of the village repeat behind Sheikh Ibrahim, and they head to the house of Atris, who cannot resist all the people of the village together.

Main cast 

 Shadia
 Mahmoud Morsi
 Yehia Chahine
 Amal Zayed
 Mohammed Tawfik
 Salah Nazmi
 Ahmed Tawfik
 Samira Mohsen
 Mahmoud Yassin
 Poussi
 Hassan El Sobky
 Wafik Fahmy

Production 
The film has a lot of symbolism, as Atris symbolizes the dictator, and the villagers symbolize the people who fall under the tyranny. Fouada symbolizes Egypt, which the dictator can not be happy with.

Some critics pointed out that this film may symbolize the period of Gamal Abdel Nasser's rule, and others pointed out that it may symbolize the period of King Farouk's rule, as some said that it symbolizes any dictatorial rule, tyranny and oppression in general.

Hussein Kamal said: The enemies of success have spread a rumor to the effect that by Atris we mean President Gamal Abdel Nasser.

A storm occurred and the film was ready to be shown, and Salah Zulfikar Films already published all posters were filling the streets. Gamal Abdel Nasser watched the film with Salah Zulfikar and watched it again with Anwar Sadat. After the second viewing, Gamal Abdel Nasser was convinced that it could not be the character of Atris and allowed the film to be shown.

See also
 Egyptian cinema
 Salah Zulfikar on screen, stage and television
 List of Egyptian films of 1969
 List of Egyptian films of the 1960s

References

External links 
 
A Taste of Fear on elCinema

1969 films
20th-century Egyptian films
1960s Arabic-language films
Films shot in Egypt
Films set in Egypt